Croft-on-Tees is a village and civil parish in the Richmondshire district of North Yorkshire, England. It has also been known as Croft Spa, and from which the former Croft Spa railway station took its name.

History

The village is mentioned in the Domesday Book as Crofst. It makes no mention of any lord of the manor prior to the Norman conquest, but names Enisant Musard as lord after 1086, granted to him by Count Alan of Brittany. The lands were subject to many years of dispute until the 13th century. In 1205, King John settled the issue by granting the lands to Roald the Constable of Richmond. His heirs inherited the title until 1299 when they were succeeded by Henry le Scrope of Bolton. Thereafter the lands were held under the Scropes by the Clervaux family. They held the manor until 1590 when the direct male line ceased, but Clervuax inheritance continued via marriage to the Chaytor family into the 20th century.

The etymology of the village name comes from the Old English word Croft meaning a small enclosed field.

Croft was once significant for its spa, first noticed in 1668, and as early as 1713 the sulphurous spring water had acquired such fame that it was sold in London as a cure for ailments and diseases as described in Robert Willan's study of the sulphur water at Croft, published London 1782.  A.B.Granville's description of the "Old Well" and the "New Well" described the Croft Spa for which the railway station was both opened and named. was published in 1841.

The village was once served by its railway station on the East Coast Main Line. The railway still passes near Croft but the station, which was opened in 1841, closed in 1968 and has been demolished.

The 1861 Epsom Derby winner Kettledrum was bred at Croft in 1858.

Geography and governance

 south of Darlington, Croft stands on the opposite side of the River Tees from Hurworth-on-Tees between Clow Beck and Spa Beck and is situated on the A167. The bridge over the Tees between Croft and Hurworth marks the boundary between North Yorkshire and County Durham. The exact point of transition is the fourth of the seven arches. It is a Grade I listed building. The settlements of Eryholme and Dalton-on-Tees are also within three miles of the village.

The village lies within the Richmond UK Parliament constituency, the Richmondshire North electoral division of North Yorkshire County Council and the Croft ward of Hambleton District Council.

An electoral ward in the name of Croft exists. This ward stretches south to North Cowton with a population taken at the 2011 census of 1,272.

Demography

2001 Census

According to the 2001 UK Census, the parish was 50.6% male and 49.4% female of the total population of 427. The religious make-up was 86.4% Christian with the rest stating no religion. The ethnic distribution was 100% White. There were 180 dwellings.

2011 Census

According to the 2011 UK Census, the parish had a total population of 466 with 50% male and 50% female. The religious make-up was 75.5% Christian, a small Hindu minority, with the rest stating no religion. The ethnic distribution was 97.8% White with a small Mixed Ethnic and British Asian minority . There were 198 dwellings.

Community

The village is served for Primary education by Croft CE Primary School which caters for ages 3 to 11 and has a capacity of 105. It lies within the catchment areas of both Northallerton School and Richmond School for secondary education.

Croft has two hotels, one a Grade II listed building. Croft motor racing circuit is built on the former aerodrome, RAF Croft.

Religion

The village church, St Peter's, is a 14th-century style building situated on the bank of the Tees. It is a Grade I listed building.

Whilst not a job in Yorkshire, the incoming Bishop of Durham meets the Mayor of Darlington to be presented with the falchion that John Conyers used to despatch the Sockburn Worm. The ceremony, which is performed on the bridge over the River Tees in the village, has been carried out since 1790.

Notable residents

Lewis Carroll lived in Croft from 1843 to 1850. His father the Revd Charles Dodgson was Rector of Croft and Archdeacon of Richmond from 1843 to 1868. Carroll's photo of the niece of Alfred Lord Tennyson's wife was taken at Croft. Historians believe Lewis Carroll's Cheshire Cat in the book Alice in Wonderland was inspired by a carving in Croft Church.

References

External links

 Village website
 Croft Circuit
 BBC article about the Croft carving

Villages in North Yorkshire
Civil parishes in North Yorkshire
Richmondshire